At the Woodstock Festival is a live album by Indian classical musician Ravi Shankar that was released in 1970 on World Pacific Records. It was recorded on 15 August 1969, during the first day of the Woodstock Festival in upstate New York. Shankar's set took place during a downpour and he later expressed his dissatisfaction with the event due to the prevalence of drugs among the crowd.

Having performed at the Monterey Pop Festival in June 1967, Woodstock was the last rock festival Shankar played, as he subsequently distanced himself from the 1960s hippie movement. He said he felt the music was only "incidental" to the party atmosphere and likened the vast rain-soaked crowd to "the water buffaloes you see in India, submerged in the mud".

The album includes an eight-minute tabla solo played by Alla Rakha. At the Woodstock Festival was issued on CD in 1991 by BGO Records.

Track listing
Side one
 "Raga Puriya–Dhanashri/Gat in Sawarital" (11 Beats) (adapted by Ravi Shankar) – 11:04
 "Tabla Solo in Jhaptal" (10 Beats 2-3-2-3) (adapted by Alla Rakha) – 8:48
Side two
 "Raga Manj Khamaj" (Alap, Jor, Dhun in Kaharwa Tal (8 Beats), Medium and Fast Gat in Teental (16 Beats)) (adapted by Shankar) – 21:31

"Raga Puriya–Dhanashri/Gat in Sawarital" was in fact a studio recording. The live version performed at Woodstock was released for the first time in 2009, on the six-CD box set Woodstock 40 Years On: Back to Yasgur's Farm.

Personnel
Ravi Shankar – sitar
Alla Rakha – tabla
Maya Kulkarni – tambura
Richard Bock – producer
Eddie Kramer – engineer

References

1970 live albums
Ravi Shankar albums
World Pacific Records live albums
Albums produced by Richard Bock (producer)
Woodstock Festival